1798 Watts, provisional designation , is a stony asteroid and binary system from the inner regions of the asteroid belt, approximately 7 kilometers in diameter.

It was discovered on 4 April 1949, by IU's Indiana Asteroid Program at Goethe Link Observatory near Brooklyn, Indiana, United States. The asteroid was named for American astronomer Chester Burleigh Watts. Its small minor-planet moon has a period of 26.96 hours.

Orbit and classification 

Watts is a member of the Flora family, a large group of stony S-type asteroids in the inner main-belt. It orbits the Sun at a distance of 1.9–2.5 AU once every 3 years and 3 months (1,192 days). Its orbit has an eccentricity of 0.12 and an inclination of 6° with respect to the ecliptic.

Physical characteristics

Spectral type 

In the SMASS classification, Watts is characterized as a common stony S-type asteroid. It is also classified as a LS-type by PanSTARRSs photometric survey.

Diameter and albedo 

According to the survey carried out by NASA's Wide-field Infrared Survey Explorer with its subsequent NEOWISE mission, Watts measures 6.63 kilometers in diameter and its surface has an albedo between 0.276 and 0.294. The Collaborative Asteroid Lightcurve Link assumes an albedo of 0.24 – derived from 8 Flora, the largest member and namesake of this asteroid family – and calculates a diameter of 7.14 kilometers with an absolute magnitude of 12.9.

Moon and lightcurve 

Lightcurve analysis gave a rotation period of 3.5060 hours with a low brightness amplitude of 0.06 magnitude, indicating that the body has a spheroidal shape.

During the photometric observations, a minor-planet moon was discovered, making Watts a binary asteroid. The satellite of the synchronous binary has an orbital period of 26.96 hours.

Naming 

This minor planet was named in honour of American astronomer Chester Burleigh Watts (1889–1971), a graduate of Indiana University. He worked at the United States Naval Observatory for 44 years, making distinguished contributions in the field of positional astronomy and pioneered in the field of automation of transit circle observations, which led to results of the highest systematic accuracy. From the late 1940 until 1963 he meticulously mapped every feature on the marginal zone of the Moon. The official  was published by the Minor Planet Center on 15 June 1973.

Notes

References

External links 
 Asteroids with Satellites, Robert Johnston, johnstonsarchive.net
 Asteroid Lightcurve Database (LCDB), query form (info )
 Dictionary of Minor Planet Names, Google books
 Asteroids and comets rotation curves, CdR – Observatoire de Genève, Raoul Behrend
 Discovery Circumstances: Numbered Minor Planets (1)-(5000) – Minor Planet Center
 
 

001978
001798
Named minor planets
001798
001798
19490404